Karina Ocasio Clemente (born August 1, 1985) is a volleyball player from Puerto Rico, who competed for the Women's National Team at the 2008 Olympic Qualification Tournament in Japan. There the team ended up in eighth and last place, having received a wild card for the event after Peru and Kenya withdrew. Ocasio became "Best Scorer" at the event, alongside Kazakhstan's Yelena Pavlova.

Career

She was part of the Puerto Rico women's national volleyball team at the 2002 FIVB Volleyball Women's World Championship in Germany., 2015 FIVB World Grand Prix, and 2022 FIVB Volleyball Women's World Championship.

Ocasio played for Fujian Xi Meng Bao in China for the 2014–2015 season.

She won the Best Scorer award at the 2015 Pan American Games, losing the bronze medal to the Dominican Republic 1-3.

Clubs
  Conquistadoras de Guaynabo (2000)
  Despar Sirio Perugia (2003–2004)
  Caoduro Cavazzale (2004–2005)
  Valencianas de Juncos (2005–2008)
  Heungkuk Life Pink Spiders (2008–2010)
  Galatasaray Medical Park (2010–2011)
  Criollas de Caguas (2013)
  Hwaseong IBK Altos (2013–2014)
  Criollas de Caguas (2014)
  Fujian Xi Meng Bao (2014–2015)
  Criollas de Caguas (2015)
  Fujian Yango (2015–2016)
  Criollas de Caguas (2017)
  Jakarta BNI 46 (2018)
  Criollas de Caguas (2019-2021)
  Al-Ahly SC (2022)

Awards

Individuals
 2008 Olympic Qualifier "Best Scorer"
 2015 NORCECA Champions Cup "Best Opposite Spiker"
 2015 Pan American Games "Best Scorer"

References

External links
 FIVB profile
 Korean League profile
 Galatasaray medical website
 Volleyverse profile

1985 births
Living people
Sportspeople from Bayamón, Puerto Rico
Puerto Rican women's volleyball players
Volleyball players at the 2007 Pan American Games
Volleyball players at the 2015 Pan American Games
Pan American Games competitors for Puerto Rico
Galatasaray S.K. (women's volleyball) players
Place of birth missing (living people)
Volleyball players at the 2016 Summer Olympics
Central American and Caribbean Games silver medalists for Puerto Rico
Central American and Caribbean Games bronze medalists for Puerto Rico
Competitors at the 2006 Central American and Caribbean Games
Competitors at the 2010 Central American and Caribbean Games
Opposite hitters
Summer Olympics competitors for Puerto Rico
Central American and Caribbean Games medalists in volleyball